Jane Marie Andrée Rhodes (March 13, 1929 – May 7, 2011) was a French opera singer whose voice encompassed both the soprano and high mezzo-soprano ranges. Her most celebrated role was Carmen, which she sang in the opera's first ever staging at the Palais Garnier. She also created the roles of Isadora in Marcel Landowski's  and Maguelone in Georges Delerue's Le Chevalier de Neige and sang Renata in the first recorded performance of Prokofiev's The Fiery Angel. Admired for both her voice and her glamorous stage presence, she was nicknamed the "Bardot of the Opéra". She was married to conductor Roberto Benzi.

References

Sources 
Agence France-Presse (May 7, 2011). "French opera singer Jane Rhodes dies"
Diapason (May 8, 2011). "Jane Rhodes, l'une de nos plus belles Carmen, est morte"

Kuhn, Laura (ed.) (2000). "Rhodes, Jane (Marie Andrée)". Baker's Dictionary of Opera. Schirmer Books, p. 652. 
L'Express (May 9, 2011). "La cantatrice Jane Rhodes est morte"
Metropolitan Opera Archives. Performance Record: Rhodes, Jane (Soprano)

External links 
Jane Rhodes: "Ma divine folle!"  Biography of Jane Rhodes by Bruno-Pierre Wauthier with portraits and magazine covers on which Rhodes appeared during her career 

Singers from Paris
1929 births
2011 deaths
French operatic mezzo-sopranos
French operatic sopranos
Knights of the Ordre national du Mérite
Commandeurs of the Ordre des Arts et des Lettres
20th-century French women opera  singers